No. 37 Squadron RAF Regiment was a Ground Based Aircraft Defence (GBAD) squadron of the Royal Air Force Regiment. The squadron operated mostly outside the United Kingdom since its formation in 1951 until 2006 when it was disbanded. It started out as a field squadron before becoming involved in the GBAD programme, where it operated the Rapier missile system.

History
No. 37 Squadron RAF Regiment was formed at RAF Yatesbury in 1951. In the early 1960s, No. 37 Squadron was deployed to RAF Khormaksar to help in combatting the terrorist forces at work in Aden at that time. Whilst deployed in the Middle-East in 1963, three former British colonies in East Africa were the subject of mutinies by their respective armed forces. 37 squadron was deployed to Tanzania to secure an airhead there, whilst the Royal Marines were sent to quell the mutinies.

In 1976, the squadron deployed with Rapiers to RAF Bruggen in Germany alongside 16, 26 and 63 Squadrons (at Wildenrath, Laarbruch and Gütersloh respectively). With the end of the Cold War, the decision was taken to withdraw most of the RAF Units and Squadrons from Germany with 37 Squadron being one of the last to transfer to from Bruggen to RAF Wittering in October 2001.

In 1998, the squadron numbered around 100 personnel. In July 2005, it was announced in Parliament that No. 37 Squadron would be disbanded along with three other RAF Regiment GBAD squadrons (15, 16 and 26) in favour of the GBAD responsibility being handed over to the Royal Regiment of Artillery. Of the four squadrons, No. 37 was the first to be disbanded in March 2006, with its final home being RAF Wittering in Cambridgeshire.

No. 37 Squadron's Standard was awarded to them by Air Marshal Peter Terry in 1980.

Locations
Abu Sueir
Nicosia
Akrotiri
Upwood
Khormaksar
Aldergrove/Ballykelly/Bishops Court in roulement with other RAF Regiment squadrons and Royal Marine Commandoes
Catterick
Bruggen
Wittering

Notable personnel
Air Vice-Marshal David Hawkins, officer commanding 1971 to 1974

References

Sources

External links

Royal Air Force Regiment squadrons
Military units and formations established in 1951
Military units and formations disestablished in 2006
1951 establishments in the United Kingdom